Balcombe may refer to:

 Balcombe, West Sussex, England
 Balcombe railway station
 Balcombe tunnel
 Balcombe Street Siege, IRA incident in London

People with the surname
 David Balcombe, cricketer
 Graham Balcombe, pioneer cave diver